Santhosh Venky is an Indian playback singer known for his work in Kannada cinema. He has performed for many Kannada film songs. Starting his singing career from the film Krishnan Marriage Story in 2011, Santhosh Venky recorded for many film songs and won Karnataka State Film Awards and Filmfare Awards South for his singing.

Filmography
2015 	Aatagara
2015   Preethiyalli Sahaja
2015 	Rhaatee
2016 	Jai Maruthi 800
2018   K.G.F: Chapter 1
2019   Yajamana (2019 film)
2022   Odeya
2022   Iravan
2022   Shokiwala
2021   Antim: The Final Truth
2022   Nam annayya
2022   Madhagaja
2022   ET
2022   K.G.F: Chapter 2
2022   Liger

Awards

State Awards
 2015 – Karnataka State Film Award for Best Male Playback Singer – "Sundarangiye" (Preethiyalli Sahaja)

Filmfare Awards
 2015 – Filmfare Award for Best Male Playback Singer – Kannada – "Raja Raniyanthe" (Rhaatee)
 2016 - Nominated - "Mandara Mandara" ("Jai Maruthi 800")

SIIMA Awards
 2015 – SIIMA Award for Best Male Playback Singer – "Raja Raniyanthe" (Rhaatee)
 2018 – SIIMA Award for Best Male Playback Singer – "Salaam Rocky bhai" (K.G.F: Chapter 1)
 2019 – SIIMA Award for Best Male Playback Singer – "Shivanandi" (Yajamana)

Mirchi Music Awards
 2015 – MirchiMusicAwardsSouth Male Vocalist of the year – "Raja Raniyanthe" (Rhaatee)

References

External links

Santhosh Venky - Listen to Santhosh Venky songs/music online

Year of birth missing (living people)
Living people
Indian male playback singers
Filmfare Awards South winners
Kannada playback singers
Singers from Bangalore